Charles Brown Lore (March 16, 1831 – March 6, 1911) was an American lawyer and politician from Wilmington, in New Castle County, Delaware. He was a member of the Democratic Party, who served as Attorney General of Delaware and U. S. Representative from Delaware.

Early life and family
Lore was born in Cantwell's Bridge (now Odessa), Delaware on March 16, 1831. He attended the public schools and Middletown Academy in Middletown, Delaware. He graduated from Dickinson College in Carlisle, Pennsylvania in June 1852, then studied law and was admitted to the Delaware Bar in New Castle County, Delaware in 1861.

Professional and political career
He was clerk of the Delaware House of Representatives in 1857 and during the Civil War served as commissioner of the federal army's draft for New Castle County in 1862.

Lore served as Delaware Attorney General from 1869 to 1874 and was elected as a Democrat to the 48th and 49th Congress, serving from March 4, 1883, to March 3, 1887. He was not a candidate for renomination, and was appointed Chief Justice of the Delaware Supreme Court in 1893. He was reappointed in 1897 for a term of twelve years but retired in 1909. He was also a member of the code commission in 1909 and 1910.

He also served as the inaugural president of the Board of Trustees of then-Delaware College for Colored Students outside of Dover (legislatively renamed in 1893 as the State College for Colored, and which is currently Delaware State University). He would serve board president from the College's beginning in 1891 until about 1909.

Death and legacy
Lore died at his home in Wilmington on March 6, 1911. His remains were cremated and the ashes were deposited there in the Methodist Church Cemetery.

The Charles B. Lore Elementary School at Wilmington, was added to the National Register of Historic Places in 1983.

Almanac
Elections are held the first Tuesday after November 1. U.S. Representatives took office March 4 and have a two-year term.

References

External links
Biographical Directory of the United States Congress
Delaware's Members of Congress
Find a Grave
The Political Graveyard

Places with more information
Delaware Historical Society; website; 505 North Market Street, Wilmington, Delaware 19801; (302) 655-7161
University of Delaware; Library website; 181 South College Avenue, Newark, Delaware 19717; (302) 831-2965

1831 births
1911 deaths
Methodists from Delaware
People from Odessa, Delaware
Dickinson College alumni
Delaware Attorneys General
Chief Justices of Delaware
Democratic Party members of the United States House of Representatives from Delaware
19th-century American politicians
19th-century American judges